Eino Anthony Mayberry (born December 8, 1967) is a former American football player who played center for the Tampa Bay Buccaneers from 1990 to 1999. He was selected to three Pro Bowls.

References

1967 births
Living people
American football centers
Tampa Bay Buccaneers players
Wake Forest Demon Deacons football players
National Conference Pro Bowl players
Sportspeople from Alexandria, Virginia
Sportspeople from Würzburg
Players of American football from Virginia